Marriage in the United Kingdom has different laws and procedures in the different countries. For details see:

Marriage in England and Wales
Marriage in Northern Ireland
Marriage in Scotland

History
A survey in the United Kingdom in 2011 showed that people who are married are more likely to be happy than those who are not married.

Civil partnerships for same-sex couples were introduced in 2004 and became available in 2005. Same-sex marriage has been legal in England and Wales since 2014, with Scotland also allowing same-sex marriage later in 2014.

See also
 Same-sex marriage in the United Kingdom
 Civil partnership in the United Kingdom
 Polygamy in the United Kingdom

Notes